Michael Simms may refer to:

 Michael Simms (boxer) (born 1974), American boxer
 Michael Simms (publisher) (born 1954), American poet and literary publisher
 Mike Simms, Major League Baseball outfielder